Alexius Frederick, Prince of Bentheim and Steinfurt (20 January 1781 – 3 November 1866) was a German nobleman.

Life 
He descended from the younger branch of the House of Bentheim-Steinfurt. His father was Prince Louis William Geldricus Ernest of Bentheim and Steinfurt; his mother was Juliane Wilhelmine of Schleswig-Holstein-Sonderburg-Glücksburg

He studied in Marburg under Johann Stephan Pütter.  In 1817, he succeeded his father as Prince of Bentheim and Steinfurt.  In 1821, the Bentheim-Tecklenburg-Rheda line of the family sued him, claiming to have better rights to the counties of Bentheim and Steinfurt.  The court case about the parts of the counties in Prussia lasted until 1829; the trial about the parts in Hanover lasted even longer.  Prince Alexius ultimately won both court cases.

Incidentally, the County of Bentheim had been pledged to Hanover long before his reign.  In 1823, Alexius redeemed this loan.  He began the restoration of the run-down Bentheim Castle.  He built a spa around the sulphur-rich springs in the town of Bentheim.  The town would change its name to Bad Bentheim in 1979, to reflect its status as a spa town.

Alexius was a member of the provincial parliament of the Prussian province of Westphalia.  In 1847, he became a member of the short-lived United Parliament.  In 1854, he officially became a member of the Prussian House of Lords; however he was never an active member.

Marriage and issue 
In 1811, he married Wilhelmina of Solms-Braunfels, first daughter and child of William Christian Carl, 3rd Prince of Solms-Braunfels. They had six children, including his heir Louis William.

References 
 Christina Rathgeber (ed.): Die Protokolle des Preußischen Staatsministeriums 1817–1934/38, vol. 1: 19. März 1817 bis 30. Dezember 1829, Olms-Weidmann, Hildesheim, 2001, p. 373
Eduard Vehse: Geschichte der deutschen Höfe seit der Reformation, vol. 40, Hamburg, 1857, p. 320 ff

External links 
 Entry at his-data.de 

House of Bentheim
Princes of Bentheim and Steinfurt
Members of the Prussian House of Lords
Counts of Bentheim
Counts of Steinfurt
1781 births
1866 deaths
19th-century German people